WKLM is a commercial FM radio station in Millersburg, Ohio, United States, broadcasting at 95.3 MHz with an adult contemporary music format. Much of their broadcasts center on local news in Holmes County. They also carry all of the West Holmes Knights football games and many West Holmes and Hiland basketball games.

The station is owned and operated by WKLM Radio, Inc., headed by Bruce Wallace of Coshocton, who also owns WTNS and WTNS-FM there. The station signs off at 12am, and signs back onto the air between 5am and 5:30am daily.

WKLM hit the airwaves on August 15, 1988, at 5:00 a.m. The original owner was Graphic Publications, Inc., publisher of The Bargain Hunter, founded by Abe and Fran Mast in 1973. WKLM hired Kim Kellogg as the first general manager. Skip Randolf was the first program director, Brad Shupe the first sports director and Lorin Miller the first news director. Other original on-air talent included Ron Strong (currently OM/PD WCLT AM/FM Newark), Skip Randolf, Brad Shupe, David Hintz, Kathy Linn, Alan Reed, Brett Swinderman and Mike Miller.

External links

KLM